Banque de Tunisie et des Emirats (BTE) is a bank in Tunisia. It is listed in the Bourse de Tunis.

Overview
Banque de Tunisie et des Emirats was founded in 1982 as a result of an agreement between Tunisia and the United Arab Emirates. It is headquartered in Tunis, Tunisia. It is partly owned by the Abu Dhabi Investment Authority.

External links

References

1982 establishments in Tunisia
Banks established in 1982
Banks of Tunisia
Companies listed on the Bourse de Tunis